Henry Township is a township in Vernon County, in the U.S. state of Missouri.

Henry Township was originally called "Summers Township", and under the latter was established in 1855. The present name, adopted in 1856, honors John McHenry, a pioneer citizen.

References

Townships in Missouri
Townships in Vernon County, Missouri